Unione Sportiva Viterbese 1908, commonly known as Viterbese, is an Italian football club, based in Viterbo, Lazio. Viterbese currently plays in Serie C, the third tier of Italian football.

Colors and badge 
The team's colors are yellow and blue.

Players

Current squad
.

Out on loan

References

External links
 Official homepage

 
Football clubs in Italy
Viterbo
Association football clubs established in 1908
Football clubs in Lazio
Serie C clubs
1908 establishments in Italy
Coppa Italia Serie C winning clubs